is a Japanese football player for Sagan Tosu.

Club career
Horigome was born in Kofu on December 13, 1992. In August 2010, he joined his local club Ventforet Kofu from youth team. From 2013, he played for Roasso Kumamoto and Ehime FC. He returned Ventforet in 2015. In 2016, he moved to Kyoto Sanga FC. In 2017, he returned to Ventforet.

National team career
In October 2009, Horigome was elected for the Japan U-17 national team to play in the 2009 U-17 World Cup. He played all 3 matches.

Club statistics
Updated to 19 July 2022.

Awards and honours

Club
  Ventforet Kofu
J. League Division 2 (1) : 2012

References

External links
Profile at Ventforet Kofu
j-league

1992 births
Living people
Association football people from Yamanashi Prefecture
Japanese footballers
Japan youth international footballers
J1 League players
J2 League players
Ventforet Kofu players
Roasso Kumamoto players
Ehime FC players
Kyoto Sanga FC players
JEF United Chiba players
Montedio Yamagata players
Sagan Tosu players
Association football midfielders